Hill & Wang is an American book publishing company focused on American history, world history, and politics. It is a division of Farrar, Straus and Giroux.

Hill & Wang was founded as an independent publishing house in 1956 by Arthur Wang (1917/18–2005) and Lawrence Hill, who were both working at A. A. Wyn. They bought backlist books from Wyn and started Dramabooks, publishing plays in trade paperback, then a new format. The series included Jean Cocteau, Arthur L. Kopit and Lanford Wilson. In 1959, Arthur Wang acquired Elie Wiesel's Holocaust memoir, Night, which had been turned down by several English-language publishers, publishing it in 1960. They continued to build the Hill & Wang list to include such authors as Roland Barthes, Langston Hughes, and American historians Stanley Kutler and William Cronon.

In 1971, the two sold Hill & Wang to Farrar, Straus and Giroux, and the imprint continues to be recognized for its high quality nonfiction. More recently, it has published authors such as Cass Sunstein, Philip Gura, John Allen Paulos, Melvyn Leffler, Thomas Bender, William Poundstone, Woody Holton, and Eric Rauchway.

The imprint also launched a graphic line, "Novel Graphics," when it published a graphic adaptation of the 9/11 Commission Report by Sid Jacobson and Ernie Colón. It has since published several graphic biographies and works of graphic journalism, and a graphic adaptation of the United States Constitution.

Notable authors
 Roland Barthes, Numerous works in translation.
 Elizabeth A. Fenn, Encounters at the Heart of the World, Hill & Wang, 2014. Winner of Pulitzer Prize for History.
 Philip Gura, American Transcendentalism (Hill & Wang, 2007). Nominee for the National Book Critics Circle Award
 Woody Holton, Unruly Americans and the Origins of the Constitution (Hill & Wang, 2007). Finalist for the National Book Award
 Jack London, The Iron Heel (Hill & Wang, 1957, 1966, 1967, 1968, 1969).
 William Pfaff, Barbarian Sentiments: How the American Century Ends (Hill & Wang, 1989). Finalist for the National Book Award
 Elie Wiesel, Night (Hill & Wang, 1960, 2006).

References

External links
 Hill & Wang
 Hill & Wang's current books
 Hill & Wang archived site
 Farrar, Straus and Giroux

Book publishing companies based in New York City
Publishing companies established in 1956
1971 mergers and acquisitions
1956 establishments in New York City